Heavy Rescue: 401 is a Canadian reality television show that follows the operations of multiple heavy vehicle rescue and recovery towing companies, as well as the Ontario Provincial Police (OPP), Ministry of Transportation of Ontario, and York Regional Police, based in the Greater Toronto Area (GTA) and the Southern Ontario region. The show focuses on the hardships of vehicle recovery along Ontario's Highway 401 and other 400-series highways, frequently in the Greater Toronto Area.

After the success of Highway Thru Hell, series creator Mark Miller developed a spinoff series titled Heavy Rescue: 401, which debuted on January 3, 2017, on Discovery Canada following the October 2016 pilot. The show is produced by Great Pacific Television, and executive produced by Kelly McClugan and Blair Reekie.

History

After The Weather Channel's show Highway Thru Hell achieved success, series creator Mark Miller decided to make another series about heavy recovery in Canada.

On April 18, 2019, the show was shown on The Weather Channel in place of their morning forecast due to hackers attacking the station and taking the live forecasting off-air.

Episodes

Season 1 (2016–17)

Season 2 (2018)

Season 3 (2019)

Season 4 (2020)

Season 5 (2021)

Season 6 (2022)

References

External links
 Official Discovery Channel Canada website: Heavy Rescue: 401 (original network website)
 Heavy Rescue 401 on Twitter: https://twitter.com/HeavyRescue401
 Heavy Rescue 401 on Facebook: https://www.facebook.com/HeavyRescue401

 

2010s Canadian reality television series
2017 Canadian television series debuts
Lists of Canadian television series episodes